Museo civico di Cerchio (Italian for Civic Museum of Cerchio)  is a  museum of religious art in Cerchio, Province of L'Aquila (Abruzzo).

History

Collection

Notes

External links

Cerchio
Museums in Abruzzo
Religious museums in Italy